Opol, officially the Municipality of Opol, is a 2nd class municipality in the province of Misamis Oriental, Philippines. According to the 2020 census, it has a population of 66,327 people.

Opol was created from the barrios of Opol, Igpit, and Lower Iponan, formerly part of Cagayan de Oro, by virtue of Republic Act No. 524, approved June 15, 1950.

The municipality is gradually becoming more urbanized, as a result of local population growth and the expansion of nearby Cagayan de Oro. Historically, Opol was a more rural area focused on agriculture and fishing. The subdivision of rural land for new residential housing is a matter of some controversy amongst locals. The current Mayor, Jayfrancis D.Bago (known as "Jay Bago"), has held office in Opol after Maximo Seno.

Geography

Barangays
Opol is politically subdivided into 14 barangays.

Climate

Demographics

Economy

Key economic activities in Opol include commercial fishing, farming, tourism/hospitality, and light industry. Notable economic infrastructure includes the San Miguel/Coca-Cola bottling plant, Lechem Food Marketing, and fishing port at Luyong-Bonbon as well as the municipal market building, located adjacent to the Opol municipal centre.

The Cagayan de Oro - Iligan highway passes through Opol, alongside the coast. The highway is a key inter-regional transport route and comprises an integral part of the Cagayan de Oro - Iligan Corridor Special Development Project. This is a major infrastructure development initiative which is likely to result in significant economic growth for Opol, Misamis Oriental and the adjoining province of Lanao del Norte in coming years.

Tourism
 Philippine Ostrich & Crocodile Farm is the first combined ostrich and crocodile farm in the Philippines. The farm is home to several hundred ostrich and several dozen crocodiles, with both species being cultivated for leather and meat. The farm is open to the public for supervised tours.
 Apple Tree Beach Resort (formerly called Lauremar Beach Resort, after being under new management) is a popular tourist resort located on the main beach in central Opol.
 Opol Aviary and Mini Zoo features a wide variety of native birds and animals (Closed as of 2014).
 San Pedro Beach Resort is the first beach resort in Misamis Oriental. With big halls and cottages that could cater to seminars, weddings and other large gatherings. It also has medium to small size open air cottages for cozy and more private family or friends gathering. It also has affordable air-conditioned rooms with own bathroom and TV.
 D. Yasay Beach Resort is an affordable party place for family/barkada gimik and company events.  With clean open air cottages, social hall and air-conditioned rooms to choose from, guests are sure to find one that is just right for their budget.
 Seven Seas Waterpark and Resort is Mindanao's 1st world class water theme park near Barra. It provides resort entertainment such as long and big slides, pirate ships, and more.

References

External links

 
 [ Philippine Standard Geographic Code]
Philippine Census Information
Local Governance Performance Management System

Municipalities of Misamis Oriental